Denis Dimitrov (born 10 February 1994) is a Bulgarian sprinter. He competed in the 100 metres event at the 2013 World Championships in Athletics.

Competition record

Personal bests
Outdoor
100 metres – 10.16 (+1.5 m/s) (Pravets 2013)
200 metres – 21.03 (+1.5 m/s) (Rieti 2013)

Indoor
60 metres – 6.65 (Prague 2015)

References

External links
 

1994 births
Living people
Bulgarian male sprinters
World Athletics Championships athletes for Bulgaria
People from Montana, Bulgaria